Norman Aviation is a Canadian aircraft manufacturer originally based in Lévis, Quebec and now in Saint-Anselme, Quebec. The company specializes in the design and manufacture of steel tube and wood ultralight aircraft on a custom basis.

The company was founded by and is currently owned by Jacques Norman, to produce his designs and those of other designers. All his aircraft utilize 4130 steel tube fuselage construction and wooden wings, with the whole aircraft covered in doped aircraft fabric.

Aircraft

References

External links

Aircraft manufacturers of Canada